Tandava (also spelled as ) also known as , is a divine dance performed by Hindu god Shiva. Shiva is depicted as dancing the Tandava in his form of Nataraja.

The Natya Shastra, a Sanskrit treatise on the performing arts describes various aspects of the Tandava.

Description

Tandava, as performed in the sacred dance-drama of India, has vigorous, brisk movements. Performed with joy, the dance is called Ananda Tandava.  Performed in a violent mood, the dance is called Raudra or Rudra Tandava. The types of Tandava found in the Hindu texts are:  Ananda Tandava, Tripura Tandava, Sandhya Tandava, Samhara Tandava, Kali (Kalika) Tandava, Uma Tandava, Shiva Tandava, Krishna Tandava and Gauri Tandava.

Shivani Tandava is described as a vigorous dance that is the source of the cycle of creation, preservation and dissolution. While the Rudra Tandava depicts his violent nature, first as the creator and later as the destroyer of the universe, even of death itself, the Ananda Tandava depicts him as joyful. In Shaiva Siddhanta tradition, Shiva as Nataraja (lit. "King of dance") is considered to be supreme lord of dance.

Tandava takes its name from Tandu, the attendant of Shiva, who instructed Bharata (author of the Natya Shastra) in the use of Angaharas and Karanas modes of the Tandava at Shiva's order. Some scholars consider that Tandu himself must have been the author of an earlier work on the dramatic arts, which was incorporated into the Natya Shastra. The Natya Shastra portrays Shiva narrating about the various aspects of the dance to the god Brahma.

The 32 Angaharas and 108 Karanas are discussed by Bharata in the 4th chapter of the Natya Shastra, Tandava Lakshanam. Karana is the combination of hand gestures with feet to form a dance posture. Angahara is composed of seven or more Karanas.

"How many various dances of Shiva are known to His worshipers I cannot say. No doubt the root idea behind all of these dances is more or less one and the same, the manifestation of primal rhythmic energy.  Whatever the origins of Shiva's dance, it became in time the clearest image of the activity of God which any art or religion can boast of." - Ananda Coomaraswamy

The dance is described as a pictorial allegory of the five principle manifestations of eternal energy:
 Srishti - creation, evolution
 Sthiti - preservation, support
 Samhara - destruction, evolution
 Tirodhana - illusion
 Anugraha - release, emancipation, grace

The dance performed by Shiva's wife Parvati in response to Shiva's Tandava is known as Lasya, in which the movements are gentle, graceful and sometimes erotic.  Some scholars consider Lasya to be the feminine version of Tandava. There are two types of Lasya, Jarita Lasya and Yauvaka Lasya.

The Hindu scriptures narrate various occasions when Shiva performed the Tandava. When Sati (first wife of Shiva, who was reborn as Parvati) gave up her life in Daksha's sacrifice, Shiva is said to have performed the Rudra Tandava to express his grief and anger. The Shivapradosha stotra says when Shiva performs the Sandhya Tandava, the other gods like Brahma, Vishnu, Sarasvati, Lakshmi and Indra play musical instruments and sing Shiva's praises.

Shiva Tandava Stotram is a stotra (Hindu hymn) that describes Shiva's power and beauty written by Ravana, the great devotee of Lord Shiva.

Association with other deities

Ganesha, the son of Shiva, is depicted as Ashtabhuja tandavsa nritya murtis (Eight armed form of Ganesha dancing the Tandava) in temple sculptures.

The Bhagavata Purana talks of Krishna dancing his Tandava on the head of the serpent Kaliya. King Chikka Devaraja (the  fourteenth maharaja of the Kingdom of Mysore) minted a series of gold coins called "Devaraja [with] the image of dancing Krishna" (tandava krishnamurti devaraja) to commemorate his coronation. Purandara Dasa calls the dancing Krishna ("Nritya Krishna") as "Tandava Krishna".

According to Jain traditions, Indra is said to have performed the Tandava in honour of Rishabha (Jain tirthankar) on the latter's birth.

Indian classical dance
In Kathak dance three types of Tandavas are generally used, they are, Krishna Tandava, Shiva Tandava and Ravana Tandava, but sometimes a fourth variety - Kalika Tandava, is also often used. Bharatanatyam and Kuchipudi have variants of Krishna dancing his Tandava on Kaliya.

The Manipuri dance is categorized as either "Tandava" (vigorous, usually go with Shiva, Shakti or Krishna as warrior-savior themed plays) or lasya (delicate, usually go with love stories of Radha and Krishna). In the Krishna Tandava in Raslila performance of Manipuri dance is graceful yet with swift movement and acrobatic gestures.

Sculpture 
The 108 karanas of Tandava have inspired Shiva sculptures of the 1st-millennium BCE, particularly the Tandava style which fuses many of these into a composite image found at the Nataraja temple of Chidambaram.

Shiva as Nataraja or Krishna dancing the Tandava is a recurring theme in the Chola period bronzes. Various Shiva temples in South India depict the dancing Nataraja.

References

Bibliography

External links
 Description of the Class Dance (tāṇḍava), Chapter IV of the Nāṭyaśāstra

Dances of India
Hindu mythology
Shaivism
Bharatanatyam